Abelmoschus is a genus of about fifteen species of flowering plants in the mallow family (Malvaceae), native to tropical Africa, Asia and northern Australia. It was formerly included within Hibiscus, but is now classified as a distinct genus. The genus name derives from Arabic meaning 'father of musk' or 'source of musk' referring to the scented seeds.

The genus comprises annual and perennial herbaceous plants, growing to 2 m tall. The leaves are 10–40 cm long and broad, palmately lobed with 3-7 lobes, the lobes are very variable in depth, from barely lobed, to cut almost to the base of the leaf. The flowers are 4–8 cm diameter, with five white to yellow petals, often with a red or purple spot at the base of each petal. The fruit is a capsule, 5–20 cm long, containing numerous seeds.

Abelmoschus species are used as food plants by the larvae of some Lepidoptera species including Chionodes hibiscella which has been recorded on A. moschatus.

Species

Plants of the World Online currently includes:
 Abelmoschus angulosus Wall. ex Wight & Arn.
 Abelmoschus caillei (A.Chev.) Stevels – (syn. Hibiscus manihot var. caillei).  West African okra
 Abelmoschus crinitus Wall. – (syb. Hibiscus crinitus)
 Abelmoschus enbeepeegearensis K.J.John, Scariah, Nissar, K.V.Bhat & S.R.Yadav
 Abelmoschus esculentus (L.) Moench – (syn. Hibiscus esculentus). Okra
 Abelmoschus ficulneus (L.) Wight & Arn. – (syn. Hibiscus ficulneus). White wild musk mallow
 Abelmoschus hostilis (Wall. ex Mast.) M.S.Khan & M.S.Hussain
 Abelmoschus manihot (L.) Medik. – (syn. Hibiscus manihot). Aibika
 Abelmoschus moschatus Medik. – (syn. Hibiscus abelmoschus). Abelmosk
 Abelmoschus muliensis K.M.Feng
 Abelmoschus palianus Sutar, K.V.Bhat & S.R.Yadav
 Abelmoschus sagittifolius (Kurz) Merr.

Uses 
Several species are edible, with both the young seed pods and the young leaves being eaten as a vegetable. The most important commercially-grown species is okra.

Abelmoschus manihot (aibika) furnishes cordage like jute, and Abelmoschus moschatus (abelmosk) is grown for musk seeds (musk ambrette, a musk substitute, which can cause phytophotodermatitis).

Gallery of different species

References 

 Kundu BC, Biswas C. 1973. Anatomical characters for distinguishing the genera Abelmoschus and Hibiscus. Proc. Indian Sci. Congr. 60. (3): 295

 
Malvaceae genera
Paleotropical flora